Stomatia decussata is a species of sea snail, a marine gastropod mollusk in the family Trochidae, the top snails.

Description
The ovate-oblong shell is longitudinally and transversely decussately striate, with two simple or subtuberculated angular, prominent carinae. The shell is pale, varied with brown spots. The spire is elevated. The oblique aperture is nearly circular. The lip is biangulate in the middle.

This species is decussated with transverse and longitudinal striae, and there are two prominent, angular, keels on the whorls. The spire is acute and prominent.

Distribution
This marine species occurs off the Philippines and off Queensland, Australia

References

 Brazier, J. 1877. Continuation of the Mollusca collected during the Chevert Expedition. Proceedings of the Linnean Society of New South Wales 2: 41–53

decussata
Gastropods described in 1850